Rudolf Swoboda (1859–1914) was a 19th-century Austrian Orientalist painter. He was sometimes known as The Younger, to distinguish him from his uncle Rudolf,  who was also an artist.

Biography 

He studied under his father, Eduard Swoboda, and his uncle Leopold Carl Müller, and traveled with him to Egypt in 1880. His sister was the portrait painter Josefine Swoboda, also well known for her portraits of the British Royal Family.

In 1886, Queen Victoria commissioned him to paint several of a group of Indian artisans who had been brought to Windsor Castle as part of the Golden Jubilee preparations. Victoria liked the resulting paintings so much that she paid his way to India to paint more of her Indian subjects.

He depicted many of the ordinary people of India in groups of paintings that were mostly small (no more than eight inches high).

While in India, he stayed, part of the time, with John Lockwood Kipling, and met his son Rudyard Kipling. The younger Kipling was unimpressed with Swoboda, writing to a friend about two "Austrian maniacs" who thought they were "almighty" artists aiming to "embrace the whole blazing East".

Upon his return from India, he also painted (in 1888 and 1889) two portraits of Abdul Karim (the Munshi), Victoria's favorite Indian servant.

Most of his Indian paintings hang at Osborne House, once Victoria's residence on the Isle of Wight.

The record price paid for a Swoboda painting was for The Carpet Menders, which sold in 2008 for US$2.6 million at Christie's.

See also
 List of Orientalist artists

Sources
 
 Herbert Zemen (Ed.): Der Orientmaler Rudolf Swoboda. 1859–1914. Leben und Werk. Privately published, Zemen, Vienna 2004.

External links 

1859 births
1914 deaths
19th-century Austrian painters
19th-century Austrian male artists
20th-century Austrian painters
Artists from Vienna
Austrian people of Czech descent
Austrian male painters
Austrian orientalists
Orientalist painters
20th-century Austrian male artists